Code page 851 (CCSID 851) (CP 851, IBM 851, OEM 851) is a code page used under DOS to write Greek language although it lacks the letters Ϊ and Ϋ. It covers the German language as well. It also covers some accented letters of the French language, but it lacks most of the accented capital letters required for French. It is also called MS-DOS Greek 1.

It has been superseded by Code page 869.

Character set
The following table shows code page 851. Each character is shown with its equivalent Unicode code point. Only the second half of the table (code points 128–255) is shown, the first half (code points 0–127) being the same as code page 437.

See also
LMBCS-2

References

851